Ivan Kvitka (born May 4, 1967, Kalach, Sverdlovsk Oblast) is a Russian political figure and a deputy of the 8th State Duma.

In 2000, Kvitka was granted a Candidate of Sciences degree in Philosophy. From 1992 to 1997, he worked as Vice-Rector for General Affairs of the Tyumen State Institute of World Economics, Management and Law. In 2001-2007, he was the deputy of the Tyumen Regional Duma of the 3rd and 4th convocations. In 2007, he was elected deputy of the State Duma of the 5th convocation. In 2011, 2016, and 2021, he was re-elected for the 6th, 7th, and 8th State Dumas.

Awards 
Order "For Merit to the Fatherland"

References

1967 births
Living people
United Russia politicians
21st-century Russian politicians
Eighth convocation members of the State Duma (Russian Federation)
Seventh convocation members of the State Duma (Russian Federation)
Sixth convocation members of the State Duma (Russian Federation)
Fifth convocation members of the State Duma (Russian Federation)